Face of the Screaming Werewolf is a 1965 horror film created by low budget film maker Jerry Warren. The film was created by combining parts of two unrelated Mexican horror films, La Casa del Terror (1960), and La Momia Azteca (1957), with the addition of original footage shot by Warren.  It was released in 1965 on a double-bill with another of Warren's films, Curse of the Stone Hand.

Warren had earlier released his own re-edited version of La Momia Azteca in 1963, which he had retitled Attack of the Mayan Mummy. He removed large sections of the original foreign film and replaced them with newly-filmed footage featuring American actors. He later used extensive footage from this same Mexican mummy film to incorporate into his Face of the Screaming Werewolf. Ed Wood filmed a few scenes of Lon Chaney Jr. in a werewolf costume in Hollywood in 1964, which Jerry Warren incorporated into Face of the Screaming Werewolf.

Plot
A psychic woman named Ann Taylor (Rosita Arenas), regressed to a former life via hypnosis, leads archaeologists into an Aztec pyramid where they discover a tomb containing two mummies, one of which turns out to be a mummified Caucasian werewolf (Lon Chaney Jr.), the other a mummified ancient Aztec warrior (Angel di Stefani).  A mad doctor (Yerye Beirute) kidnaps the werewolf-mummy to his lab and manages to revive him, the unwrapped creature transforming into a snarling werewolf when the full moon rises.

Meanwhile, the second mummy (the Aztec warrior) escapes from captivity later that night and tries to kidnap Ann Taylor, the psychic, from her apartment, but they are both anticlimactically hit by a car and killed (off-screen) as he tries to carry her off. A hastily inserted newspaper headline alerts the public that the Mummy has been killed, bringing that plot to an abrupt end.

The werewolf kills the mad scientist, escapes from the lab and goes on a killing spree in a nearby city. The werewolf kidnaps a young woman (Yolanda Varela) from her apartment near the film's finale, and Mexican comedian Tin-Tan (German Valdes) shows up out of nowhere to attempt to rescue her (since almost all of his scenes had been edited out of the original Mexican film by Jerry Warren for this Americanized edition) and he battles the monster on a building ledge high above the city. The Werewolf escapes back to the lab with the woman, but the lab catches on fire and the nameless hero beats him to death with a burning torch somehow, and as the monster turns back into a human, a pair of American actors playing policemen dismiss the idea that there was ever a werewolf at all.

Cast

Lon Chaney Jr. as The Mummified Werewolf
Angel Di Stefani as The Aztec Mummy
Rosita Arenas as Ann Taylor (the psychic)
 Yerye Beirute as Dr. Janning
George Mitchell as Dr. Frederick Munson
Fred Hoffman as Detective Hammond
Ramón Gay (billed as Raymond Gaylord) as Dr. Edmund Redding
Alfredo W. Barron (billed as Donald Barron) as Janning's heavyset henchman
Yolanda Varela (billed as Landa Varle) as the girl carried off by the werewolf
German Valdes (aka Tin-Tan) as Hero who rescues the girl from the werewolf
Chuck Niles as newscaster Douglas Banks
Steve Conte as The Hired Thief

Reception
Michael Weldon of Psychotronic Video stated that the film did not make sense since so much of the original dialogue scenes had been removed. Cavett Binion of AllMovie referred to it as a "messy film" that contained poor dubbing and editing.

References

Sources

External links

 

1965 films
American science fiction horror films
American independent films
American black-and-white films
1960s English-language films
Films directed by Jerry Warren
Mummy films
American werewolf films
1960s American films